Prince of Tricarico is a title created by Alfonso II of Naples for Giovanni Borgia, second duke of Gandía, son of Pope Alexander VI and Vanozza Catanei in 1494. He was also named Prince of Treano and Duke of Benevento for having supported the Pope in the war against the Orsini family.

References 

15th century in the Kingdom of Naples
1494 establishments in Europe
European nobility